Mooroolbark Soccer Club, an association football club based in Mooroolbark, Melbourne, was founded in 1962 as Mooroolbark United. They were admitted into the National Soccer League for the 1977 season.  The club's first team had competed in the National Soccer League, and all players who have played at least one such match are listed below.

Geoff Ontong and Paul Ontong holds the record for the greatest number of appearances for Mooroolbark. The Australian defenders played 27 times for the club. The club's goalscoring record was held by Joe Tront, who scored seven goals in all competitions.

Key
 The list is ordered first by date of debut, and then if necessary in alphabetical order.
 Appearances as a substitute are included.

Players

References
General
 

Specific

Mooroolbark SC players
Mooroolbark
Association football player non-biographical articles